Americans for a Republican Majority (also ARMPAC) was a political action committee formed by former Republican House Majority Leader Tom DeLay and directed by Karl Gallant. On July 7, 2006 ARMPAC reached an agreement with the Federal Election Commission to pay a fine of $115,000 for various violations and to shut down operations. It filed its termination papers on April 24, 2007.

History
Originally formed by Tom DeLay (R-Texas), Jim Ellis and several of close associates, ARMPAC was created with the goal of electing a Republican majority in the United States Congress for the 2000 elections. The millions of dollars ARMPAC raised were responsible for the success of many Republican candidates, officeholders, and PACs nationwide.

An FEC audit of ARMPAC's activities during the 2002 campaign cycle (January 1, 2000 to December 31, 2002) found failures to report debts, contributions, and assets, as well as a failure to properly separate federal and non-federal spending.  On 28 July 2005, the FEC approved enforcement for the matter after accepting the adut. Dani DeLay Ferro, DeLay's daughter and spokeswoman, said the fine and shutdown of ARMPAC were voluntary. In a statement, she said that the audit "concerns highly technical FEC reporting rules, which due to their complexity, the commission has since reformed and simplified."

ARMPAC provided the blueprint for Texans for a Republican Majority (TRMPAC), a state-level PAC founded in Austin by Ellis and DeLay in 2001.

Payments to relatives
From 2001 to January 31, 2006, ARMPAC paid Christine DeLay (DeLay's wife); Dani DeLay Ferro, and Ferro's Texas firm a total of $350,304 in political consulting fees and expenses.

Officers and notable members

See also
 Texans for a Republican Majority
 Cleta Mitchell

References

External links
 Audit Shows Misreporting by DeLay PAC Fox News, August 11, 2005.
 FEC Faults Accounting at DeLay's PAC Jeffrey H. Birnbaum,  The Washington Post, August 12, 2005
 The Abramoff affair: Corruption scandal threatens Republican control of US Congress By Patrick Martin WSWS November 29, 2005
 DeLay Fails to get case tossed out R.G. Rattcliffe, The Houston Chronicle, December 6, 2005
 Earle probes DeLay tie to California donor Michael Hedges, The Houston Chronicle, December 14, 2005
 Legislators cut Abramoff connections - Missouri Republicans who accepted donations are giving the money away Ashley Henry, Missourian News, January 5, 2006
 Conciliation Agreement between FEC and ARMPAC for violations of the Federal Election Campaign Act, July 19, 2006 (pdf file)

Republican Party (United States) organizations
United States political action committees
Organizations disestablished in 2007
Organizations established in 2000
Tom DeLay